Charles Taylor Sherman (February 3, 1811 – January 1, 1879) was a United States district judge of the United States District Court for the Northern District of Ohio.

Education and career

Born on February 3, 1811, in Norwalk, Connecticut, Sherman graduated from Ohio University in 1830, with financial aid from one of his father's friends, after his father died in 1829. He read law in 1833, in the office of Henry Stoddard and under Judge Jacob Parker. He was admitted to the Ohio bar in 1833, and entered private practice in Mansfield, Ohio, from 1835 to 1867, later joined by his brother John. He was a city councilman for Mansfield in 1846. Active in public and business affairs, Sherman contributed money, labor and personal influence to the location and building of the Sandusky, Mansfield and Newark Railroad and the Pittsburgh, Fort Wayne and Chicago Railroad becoming a director of both organizations. When the American Civil War broke out he organized and was chairman of the military committee of his county, and was appointed as commandant of the military camp in Mansfield. Later he was appointed by President Abraham Lincoln as one of the commissioners to settle war claims in St. Louis, Missouri. In 1866, he was selected as one of the first government directors of the Union Pacific Railroad.

Federal judicial service

Sherman was nominated by President Andrew Johnson on March 2, 1867, to a seat on the United States District Court for the Northern District of Ohio vacated by Judge Hiram V. Willson. He was confirmed by the United States Senate on March 2, 1867, and received his commission the same day. His service terminated on November 25, 1872, due to his resignation.

Later activities

After Sherman retired from practicing law, he became interested in the organization of the agricultural society of Richland County, Ohio, and encouraged the "introduction of better modes for the larger production of better quality of fruits."

Death

Sherman died on January 1, 1879, in Cleveland, Ohio.

Family

Sherman was the eldest of thirteen children born to Charles Robert Sherman and his wife, Mary (Hoyt) Sherman. His family emigrated from England to Massachusetts in 1634. His great-grandfather and grandfather both served on the state courts of Connecticut. When Sherman was young, his family moved to Lancaster, Ohio, where his father established a prominent law practice and later became a member of the Ohio Supreme Court. His two younger brothers were John Sherman, United States Senator from Ohio, and William Tecumseh Sherman, Major General of the Union Army. Sherman married Eliza Williams of Dayton, Ohio, on February 2, 1841, and they became the parents of seven children: Mary Hoyt, who became the wife of General Nelson A. Miles, United States Army; Henry Stoddard, who became a Cleveland attorney; John J., who became a United States Marshal in New Mexico; Charles F. Cook who died in infancy; Anna Wallace, who died at the age of 20 in 1870; Eliza A. Williams, who married Colgate Hoyt of Cleveland; and Elizabeth Bancroft, who married James D. Cameron, a United States Senator from Pennsylvania.

References

Sources

External links
 History of the US Sixth District, Charles Taylor Sherman
 Sherman Genealogy Including Families of Essex, Suffolk and Norfolk, England By Thomas Townsend Sherman

Ohio politicians
1811 births
1879 deaths
American people of English descent
Judges of the United States District Court for the Northern District of Ohio
Ohio University alumni
People from Mansfield, Ohio
Politicians from Norwalk, Connecticut
Sherman family (U.S.)
United States federal judges appointed by Andrew Johnson
19th-century American judges
19th-century American politicians